The Japanese Dog is a 2013 Romanian drama film directed by Tudor Cristian Jurgiu. It was selected as the Romanian entry for the Best Foreign Language Film at the 87th Academy Awards but was not nominated for the shortlist. It is Jurgiu's debut feature film.

Plot
An elderly farmer, played by Victor Rebengiuc, has lost his wife in a flood. He has kept his wife's death hidden from their son, but his son discovers the truth anyway and rushes home to visit his father. Accompanying the son are his Japanese wife and their seven-year-old child. The farmer and his son become closer in the days that follow. However, sadness returns when they must part.

Cast
 Victor Rebengiuc as Costache (the father)
 Șerban Pavlu as Ticu (the son)
 Ioana Abur as Gabi
 Alexandrina Halic as Leanca
 Constantin Drăgănescu
 Kana Hashimoto as Hiroko (the son's wife)

See also
 List of submissions to the 87th Academy Awards for Best Foreign Language Film
 List of Romanian submissions for the Academy Award for Best Foreign Language Film

References

External links
 

2013 films
Romanian drama films
2010s Romanian-language films
2013 drama films